deepset is a startup that provides software developers with the tools to build production-ready natural language processing (NLP) systems. It was founded in 2018 in Berlin by Milos Rusic, Malte Pietsch, and Timo Möller.
deepset authored and maintains the open source software Haystack and its commercial SaaS offering deepset Cloud.

History 
In June 2018, Milos Rusic, Malte Pietsch, and Timo Möller co-founded deepset in Berlin, Germany. In the same year, the company served first customers who wanted to implement NLP services by tailoring BERT language models to their domain.

In July 2019, the company released the initial version of the open source software FARM.

In November 2019, the company released the initial version of the open source software Haystack.

Throughout 2020 and 2021 deepset published several applied research papers at EMNLP, COLING and ACL, the leading conferences in the area of NLP. In 2020, the research contributions comprised German language models named GBERT and GELECTRA, and a question answering dataset addressing the COVID-19 pandemic called COVID-QA, which was created in collaboration with Intel and has been annotated by biomedical experts.

In 2021, the research contributions comprised German models and datasets for question answering and passage retrieval named GermanQuAD and GermanDPR, a semantic answer similarity metric, and an approach for multimodal retrieval of texts and tables to enable question answering on tabular data. Haystack contains implementations of all three contributions, enabling the use of the research through the open source framework.

In November 2021, the development of the FARM framework was discontinued and its main features were integrated into the Haystack framework.

In April 2022, the company announced its commercial SaaS offering deepset Cloud.

As of October 2022, the most popular finetuned language model created by deepset was downloaded more than 7 million times.

Products and Applications 
Haystack is an end-to-end Python framework for building semantic search solutions. With its modular building blocks, software developers can implement pipelines to address various search tasks over large document collections, such as question answering, document retrieval or summarization. It integrates with Hugging Face Transformers, Elasticsearch, OpenSearch and others. The framework has an active community on GitHub, where so far more than 140 people contributed to its continuous development and it also enjoys a vibrant community on Meetup
Thousands of organizations use the framework, including Global 500 enterprises like Airbus, or Infineon, Alcatel-Lucent Enterprise, BetterUp, Etalab, and Sooth.ai.

The deepset Cloud platform supports customers at building scalable NLP applications by covering the entire process of prototyping, experimentation, deployment, and monitoring. It is built on Haystack.

FARM was a framework for adapting representation models. One of its core concepts was the implementation of adaptive models, which comprised language models and an arbitrary number of prediction heads. FARM supported domain-adaptation and finetuning of these models with advanced options, for example gradient accumulation, cross-validation or automatic mixed-precision training. Its main features were integrated into Haystack in November 2021 and its development was discontinued at that time.

Funding 
On April 28th, 2022, deepset announced a Series A investment round of $14 million led by GV, with the participation of Harpoon Ventures, Acequia Capital and a team of experienced commercial open source software and machine learning founders, such as Alex Ratner (Snorkel AI), Mustafa Suleyman (Deepmind), Spencer Kimball (Cockroach Labs), Jeff Hammerbacher (Cloudera) and Emil Eifrem (Neo4j). A previous pre-seed investment round of $1.6 million on March 8, 2021 was led by System.One and Lunar Ventures, who also participated in the subsequent Series A round.

References 

Natural language processing software
Companies of Germany